KJMQ (98.1 FM "Jamz 98.1 ") is a radio station broadcasting a Rhythmic Contemporary format. Licensed to Lihue, Hawaii, United States, the station is owned by James Primm.

History
The station went on the air as KAWV on 1997-08-01.  On 2007-10-04, the station changed its call sign to the current KJMQ.

Radio Personalities

References

External links

JMQ
Radio stations established in 1997
Rhythmic contemporary radio stations in the United States